Lola Bridgette Tash (born September 4, 1995) is a Canadian actress. She portrays Gisela Calicos on Connor Undercover. She starred as Chideh in the movie The Wild Girl, as Robin on Rookie Blue, Vicky in Reviving Ophelia and also guest starred as Vicky on The Latest Buzz, as well as many television commercials. Her roles have also included Natalia on Reign, Molly Maxwell in Molly Maxwell, Sloane Daniels on Republic of Doyle, Caitlyn in A Wife's Nightmare, and Mitzi in Four in the Morning. Tash is one of the owners of the "MyTherapistSays" social media account with Nicole Argiris, Nora Tash, and Gina Tash.

Filmography

Film

Television

References

External links

Living people
1995 births
Canadian television actresses
Canadian film actresses